Rhamphomyia nasoni is a species of dance flies (insects in the family Empididae).

References

Further reading

External links

 Diptera.info

Rhamphomyia
Insects described in 1895